Tanglin railway station, also known as Tanglin Halt, was a railway station on the Singapore-Johore Railway which served Tanglin, as well as Pasir Panjang, from 1932 to 1983.

History
As it was decided that Tank Road station was unfit to be the terminus of the line, it was decided that the Bukit Timah-Tank Road section of the line would be abandoned, and the line would instead deviate in between Bukit Panjang station and Bukit Timah station, travelling down a different route which ran along the west of the main town, to a new terminal station at Tanjong Pagar, with a new station being built at Bukit Timah, and two new stations at Tanglin and Alexandra. Tanglin railway station was opened to the public on 3 May 1932 as one of four new stations on the new route of the Singapore-Kranji railway, along Buona Vista Road. The station was small, and did not have many amenities, such as automatic machines, that were common in other smaller stations.

The station was later turned into a halt, but was turned back into a station open for passengers. In November 1955, a new service was introduced in which lorries would arrive at the station in the morning and in the evening to bring people to and fro from work from the station. This was introduced due to the low ridership of the station.

In 1983 the station had already been abandoned and demolished. The site of the former station was one of several possible locations for a railbus station for the railbus line that the Keretapi Tanah Melayu (KTM) planned to built in Singapore. The Tanglin Halt neighbourhood is named after the station.

Incidents
On May 14, 1951, forty-year-old Ng Ang Bee, the mother of ten-year-old Ng Ang Lek, was knocked down and killed by an oncoming train near the station. Ang Bee left her home in Buona Vista to call her daughter, who had been playing on the other side of the tracks, back home. Ang Bee then approached her daughter by stepping onto the railway tracks just as a train had arrived, flinging her over twenty yards. Her death was witnessed by Ang Lek. A verdict of death due to misadventure was returned.

On 20 October 1956, a woman, Chong Yit Moh, attempted to cross the railway tracks at the station, and was knocked down by an oncoming train. She was admitted to hospital in a serious condition.

Routes

References

Railway stations in Singapore opened in 1932
Defunct railway stations in Singapore